Profundiconus pacificus is a species of sea snail, a marine gastropod mollusk in the family Conidae, the cone snails and their allies.

Like all species within the genus Profundiconus, these cone snails are predatory and venomous. They are capable of "stinging" humans, therefore live ones should be handled carefully or not at all.

Description
The size of the shell attains 20 mm.

Distribution
This marine species occurs off New Caledonia and Wallis & Futuna Islands

References

 Moolenbeek, R. & Röckel, D., 1997. Conus taken off Wallis and Futuna Islands, south-west Pacific (Mollusca, Gastropoda, Conidae). Bulletin du Muséum national d'Histoire naturelle 18(3-4)"1996": 387–400, sér. série 4, part. Section A
 Tucker J.K. & Tenorio M.J. (2013) Illustrated catalog of the living cone shells. 517 pp. Wellington, Florida: MdM Publishing.

External links
 The Conus Biodiversity website
 
 Holotype in MNHN, Paris
 Puillandre N., Duda T.F., Meyer C., Olivera B.M. & Bouchet P. (2015). One, four or 100 genera? A new classification of the cone snails. Journal of Molluscan Studies. 81: 1-23

pacificus
Gastropods described in 1996